The  Haters Roast is a drag comedy tour featuring RuPaul's Drag Race contestants, organized by Murray & Peter Present. Tour performances consist of the rotating cast of drag queens "reading", or playfully insulting, their fellow castmates, celebrities and peers. One member of the cast usually plays the role of host, introducing the performers each night.

In March 2019, Trinity the Tuck left the tour as a sign of solidarity after Monét X Change was removed for missing a stop to participate in the music video for Madonna's "God Control".

Tour dates

Notes

References

RuPaul's Drag Race
Drag events